D'Aguilar may refer to:

People

 Baron Diego Pereira D' Aguilar, Portuguese nobleman and Marrano.
 Ephraim Lópes Pereira d'Aguilar, 2nd Baron d'Aguilar
 Francis d'Aguilar, British rugby union international player
 George Charles D'Aguilar, British Army officer and  Lieutenant-governor of Hong Kong 
 Joseph d'Aguilar Samuda, British engineer and politician
 Martin d'Aguilar, Spanish explorer
 Dionisio D'Aguilar, well known Bahamian businessman and former President of the Bahamas Chamber of Commerce

Places

 D'Aguilar, Queensland, a rural town in Queensland, Australia
 D'Aguilar Range, a mountain range northwest of Brisbane, Australia
 D'Aguilar National Park, a National Park in Queensland, based on the D'Aguilar Range
 Cape D'Aguilar, a peninsula in Hong Kong
 D'Aguilar Street, a street in Hong Kong
 Château d'Aguilar, a castle in France

Roads

 The D'Aguilar Highway, a highway in southeast Queensland